Kristupas Žemaitis (born 24 June 1996) is a Lithuanian basketball player who plays for BC Wolves of the Lithuanian Basketball League (LKL).

Professional career

Žemaitis started his professional career when he signed with BC Žalgiris-2 in summer 2014. He spend 3 seasons with club. In 2015-16 season Žemaitis won silver medals with club, averaging 9 points and 3,4 assists per game.

In April 2017, Vytautas Prienai–Birštonas registered him for rest of the season, because, half of the team was injured, and by the LKL rules they can't sign any player who's older than 21 years old. He debuted against Kėdainiai Nėvėžis, scoring 6 points and making 1 assists.

On November 23, 2019, he has signed with Nevėžis Kėdainiai of the Lithuanian Basketball League.

On July 24, 2022, he has signed with BC Wolves of the Lithuanian Basketball League.

National team career
Žemaitis debuted for the Lithuania men's u-18 basketball team in the 2014 FIBA Europe Under-18 Championship in Turkey. Later that summer he won gold at 2014 Summer Youth Olympics, Basketball 3x3 Boys tournament hitting buzzer beater, in final game against France.

He won silver medals with the Lithuania men's national u-20 basketball team in 2016 FIBA Europe Under-20 Championship. After solid performance at tournament, he was selected to the All-Tournament Team.

Žemaitis won gold medal with the Lithuanian team during the 2017 Summer Universiade after defeating the United States' team 74–85 in the final.

References

1996 births
Living people
Basketball players at the 2014 Summer Youth Olympics
Basketball players from Kaunas
BC Nevėžis players
BC Prienai players
BC Šiauliai players
BC Wolves players
BC Žalgiris players
Lithuanian men's basketball players
Medalists at the 2017 Summer Universiade
Point guards
Universiade gold medalists for Lithuania
Universiade medalists in basketball
Youth Olympic gold medalists for Lithuania